Look on the Blight Side is a studio album by American hip hop artist Louis Logic. It was released on Fake Four Inc. in 2013.

Track listing

References

External links
 

2013 albums
Fake Four Inc. albums
Louis Logic albums